Ildon Marques de Souza (born October 20, 1945) is a Brazilian businessman and politician. He was vice-mayor, mayor of Imperatriz and senator.

References 

1945 births
Living people
Progressistas politicians
Brazilian Socialist Party politicians
Party of National Mobilization politicians
Brazilian Democratic Movement politicians
Democrats (Brazil) politicians
Christian Labour Party politicians
Liberal Front Party (Brazil) politicians
Democratic Social Party politicians
National Renewal Alliance politicians